Froðba is a village located farthest out on the north brink of Trongisvágsfjørður, an inlet on the east coast of the island of Suðuroy in the Faroe Islands.

History
The village has eventually merged with the harbour-city of Tvøroyri. 
Froðba is usually divided into smaller places such as Hamri, Undir Skorum, Støðlunum, Torvheyggur and Bøur. Bøur is usually referred to as "Úti á Bø" the oldest inhabited area in Froðba, Bøur has a small graveyard which used to be the only one in Trongisvágsfjørður. It is no longer in use and Froðba used to have a church which was in Bø but after Froðba merged with the growing nearby town of Tvøroyri, the small church was moved to Tvøroyri, and later as the population grew the church was replaced and moved to Sandvík.

Tradition says that Froðba is the oldest village on Suðuroy and in the Faroe Islands. A legendary Danish king, Frode or Fróði, ran ashore and settled here. The place is named after him. The name Froðba was originally Fróðabæ, in Norse, which means Frode-village or settlement. The name "Fróðabæ" has changed to "Froðabø" and finally "Froðaba" and Froðba; the Faroese word bø translates into place, dwelling, settlement or village in English. The word also has a second meaning, which is field or meadow in English.
Note that other villages on Suðuroy share the ending "ba" or "Bæ", "Bø" such as Hvalba and Sumba.
The old church in Froðba housed a rune stone which was taken to Denmark in 1823 and cataloged in the Nationalmuseet but lost and rediscovered in 2003. Due to some mix up and in cataloguing since its rediscovery the rune stone's whereabouts are to this day unknown.

Heliport
There is a heliport near Froðba (at ), the only with public traffic on Suðuroy. There are helicopter flights to Tórshavn and Vágar Airport.

Gallery

See also

List of towns in the Faroe Islands

References

External links

Faroeislands.dk: Frodba Images and description of all cities on the Faroe Islands.
Photo gallery

Populated places in the Faroe Islands
Suðuroy